Electoral district no. 8 was one of the multi-member electoral districts of the Riigikogu, the national legislature of Estonia. The district was established in 1992 when the Riigikogu was re-established following Estonia's independence from the Soviet Union. It was abolished in 1995. It was conterminous with the counties of Järva and Lääne-Viru.

Election results

Detailed

1992
Results of the 1992 parliamentary election held on 20 September 1992:

The following candidates were elected:
 Personal mandates - Juhan Aare (KK), 9,341 votes; Tiit Made (EEE), 4,678 votes; and Edgar Savisaar (R), 4,678 votes.
 District mandates - Illar Hallaste (I), 4,178 votes; Ants Käärma (KK), 3,725 votes; and Kuno Raude (KK), 188 votes.
 Compensatory mandates - Rein Arjukese (ERSP), 659 votes; and Ralf Parve (SK), 2,300 votes.

References

08
Järva County
Lääne-Viru County
08
08